Conus classiarius is a species of sea snail, a marine gastropod mollusk in the family Conidae, the cone snails and their allies.

Like all species within the genus Conus, these snails are predatory and venomous. They are capable of "stinging" humans, therefore live ones should be handled carefully or not at all.

This species is considered a nomen dubium

Distribution
This marine species occurs off Madagascar.

References

 Bruguière, M. 1792. Encyclopédie Méthodique ou par ordre de matières. Histoire naturelle des vers. Paris : Panckoucke Vol. 1 i-xviii, 757 pp.
 Tucker J.K. & Tenorio M.J. (2013) Illustrated catalog of the living cone shells. 517 pp. Wellington, Florida: MdM Publishing

External links
 The Conus Biodiversity website

classiarius
Gastropods described in 1792